MV Rhum is a car ferry built for Caledonian MacBrayne in 1974. Until 1987, she operated the seasonal Lochranza crossing to Arran. Since 1998, she has been one of the Arranmore ferries in County Donegal.

History
MV Rhum was the fourth Island Class ferry built for Caledonian MacBrayne. The class gave good service, but, overtaken by demand, were replaced by Loch class vessels. They left Campbeltown for Ireland on Friday 17 April 1998.

Layout
The eight Island Class ferries, built between 1972 and 1976, were a very simple design, based on World War II landing craft. They had a two-part folding ramp at the bow, an open plan car deck incorporating a small turntable immediately aft and a sheltered area of passenger accommodation at the stern. The wheelhouse was above the passenger accommodation and the main mast above the ramp at the bow. A radar mast sat on top of the bridge, just forward of the small funnel and engine exhaust.

Service
After launch, MV Rhum ran trials on the Clyde, providing some crossings at Largs on 22 June. She entered service on 28 June on the seasonal crossing of the Kilbrannan Sound, between Claonaig, Kintyre and Lochranza on Arran. She became the permanent vessel there, replacing her smaller sister, . Each winter, Rhum relieved around the network.

When  arrived at Lochranza in 1987, Rhum became spare. She saw very varied service including at Iona (along with the regular ), at Feolin (relieving Western Ferries' ) and at Eriskay (relieving the Comhairle nan Eilean Siar ferry ). She also carried out charters to Carradale and to Ailsa Craig.

In 1994, Rhum inaugurated the Tarbert - Portavadie crossing. She proved a great success, carrying 3,500 vehicles and 15,000 passengers in her first two months and extending the season 2 weeks beyond the planned close. Plans to continue the service through the winter, were blocked by refusal of a berth in the inner harbour at Tarbert. Continued success in summer saw Rhum replaced by the larger  in November 1995 and October 1996.

Her final permanent station with CalMac was on the Scalpay crossing, where she closed the service in December 1997, with the opening of a new bridge. She spent her last few weeks on the Oban - Lismore service.

Her new Irish owner operates Rhum and Coll between Burtonport and Arranmore in County Donegal.

References

Caledonian MacBrayne
1973 ships
Isle of Arran
Ships built on the River Clyde
Ferries of the Republic of Ireland